Baozhuang Station is an elevated metro station in Ningbo, Zhejiang, China. The station is situated near Baozhuang Village. Construction of the station started in December 2012 and the station started service on March 19, 2016.

Exits 

Baozhuang Station has four exits.

References 

Railway stations in Zhejiang
Railway stations in China opened in 2016
Ningbo Rail Transit stations